Xiahou Wei ( third century), courtesy name Jiquan, was a Chinese military general and politician of the state of Cao Wei during the Three Kingdoms period of China. He was the fourth son of Xiahou Yuan and a maternal great-grandfather of Emperor Yuan of the Eastern Jin dynasty.

Life
Xiahou Wei was the fourth son of Xiahou Yuan, a general who served under Cao Cao, the warlord who laid the foundation for the Cao Wei state in the late Eastern Han dynasty before the Three Kingdoms period. His mother, whose maiden family name was Ding (丁), was a younger sister of Cao Cao's first wife. Xiahou Wei was close friends with Cao Cao's sons, including Cao Pi and Cao Zhi. He also knew Yang Hu since young and felt that he was an extraordinary talent, so he advised his second brother Xiahou Ba to arrange a marriage between Yang Hu and Xiahou Ba's daughter. Yang Hu later became a famous general in the late Three Kingdoms period and the Jin dynasty (266–420).

Xiahou Wei once met the fortune teller Zhu Jianping (朱建平), who told him, "You'll become a provincial governor by the age of 48, but you'll also encounter a major calamity. If you survive the calamity, you'll live up to 69 and will even become a ducal minister." Xiahou Wei consecutively served as the Inspector (刺史) of Jing and Yan provinces under the Cao Wei state before his 48th birthday. However, just as Zhu Jianping foretold, Xiahou Wei became critically ill by the end of the year. He thought that he would not survive, so he instructed his family to prepare for his funeral. To his surprise, he recovered from his illness towards the end of the 12th lunar month, so he threw a banquet on the eve of the Lunar New Year to celebrate. He told his guests, "I have recovered from my illness. When the sun rises tomorrow, I'll be 49 years old. I have survived the calamity that Zhu Jianping warned me about." After the banquet, he suddenly suffered a relapse and died of illness that night.

Family
Xiahou Wei had at least two sons. His first son, Xiahou Jun (夏侯駿), served as the Inspector (刺史) of Bing Province. His second son, Xiahou Zhuang (夏侯莊), married a cousin of Yang Huiyu and served as the Administrator (太守) of Huainan Commandery (淮南郡).

Xiahou Zhuang had at least two sons and one daughter. His first son, Xiahou Zhan (夏侯湛), served as a Regular Mounted Attendant (散騎常侍) and as the Chancellor (相) of Nanyang State (南陽國). His second son, Xiahou Chun (夏侯淳), served as the Administrator of Yiyang Commandery (弋陽郡). Xiahou Chun's son, Xiahou Cheng (夏侯承), served as a Regular Mounted Attendant under the Eastern Jin dynasty. Xiahou Zhuang's daughter, Xiahou Guangji (夏侯光姬), married the Western Jin dynasty prince Sima Jin (司馬覲) and gave birth to Sima Rui, the first emperor of the Eastern Jin dynasty.

See also
 Lists of people of the Three Kingdoms

References

 Chen, Shou (3rd century). Records of the Three Kingdoms (Sanguozhi).
 Fang, Xuanling (ed.) (648). Book of Jin (Jin Shu).
 Pei, Songzhi (5th century). Annotations to Records of the Three Kingdoms (Sanguozhi zhu).

Year of birth unknown
Year of death unknown
Cao Wei generals
Cao Wei politicians
Political office-holders in Shandong